The 2011 Saudi Crown Prince Cup Final was the 36th final of the Crown Prince Cup. It took place on 15 April 2011 at the King Abdul Aziz Stadium in Makkah, Saudi Arabia and was contested between Al-Wehda and Al-Hilal. It was Al-Wehda's sixth Crown Prince Cup final and Al-Hilal's 11th final. This was the second meeting between these two clubs in the final. It was Al-Wehda's first final since 1973 and Al-Hilal's fourth final in a row.

Al-Hilal won the match 5–0 to claim their tenth Crown Prince Cup title and their fourth one in a row. By winning the match 5–0, Al-Hilal recorded the biggest victory in Crown Prince Cup finals.

Teams

Venue
The King Abdul Aziz Stadium was announced as the host of the final venue. This was the first Crown Prince Cup final to be hosted in the King Abdul Aziz Stadium as well as the first domestic final to be held in the stadium.

The King Abdul Aziz Stadium was opened in 1986. The stadium was used as a venue for the 2005 Islamic Solidarity Games and hosted the final. Its current capacity is 28,000 and it is used by Al-Wehda as a home stadium.

Background
Prior to the final, the Saudi FF announced that they had redesigned the Crown Prince Cup trophy and that the new trophy would be handed to the winners of the final.

Al-Wehda reached their sixth final after defeating Al-Ettifaq 3–2 on penalties following their 2–2 draw. Al-Wehda became the first team to reach the final without winning a single match. They reached their first final since 1973 when they finished runners-up to Al-Nassr following a 2–1 defeat.

Al-Hilal reached their eleventh final after a 2–0 win against city rivals Al-Nassr. This was Al-Hilal's fourth final in a row.

This was the second meeting between these two sides in the Crown Prince Cup final. Al-Hilal won the match 4–3 in 1964. The two teams played each other twice in the season prior to the final with Al-Hilal winning both matches.

Road to the final 

Key: (H) = Home; (A) = Away

Match

Details

{| width="100%"
|valign="top" width="40%"|

See also

 2010–11 Saudi Crown Prince Cup
 2010–11 Saudi Professional League
 2011 King Cup of Champions

References

External links

Sports competitions in Saudi Arabia
April 2011 sports events in Asia
Al-Wehda Club (Mecca)
Al Hilal SFC matches